Capt. Jacob Shoemaker House is a historic home located in Delaware Water Gap National Recreation Area at Middle Smithfield Township, Monroe County, Pennsylvania.  It was built about 1810, and is a -story, fieldstone dwelling over a banked stone basement.  It has a gable roof with two dormers.  The rear of the building has a two-story porch.  It was the home of the locally prominent Shoemaker family.

It was added to the National Register of Historic Places in 1979.

References

Houses on the National Register of Historic Places in Pennsylvania
Houses completed in 1810
Houses in Monroe County, Pennsylvania
National Register of Historic Places in Monroe County, Pennsylvania
Delaware Water Gap National Recreation Area